The 2021–22 Brown Bears Men's ice hockey season was the 104th season of play for the program and the 60th in the ECAC Hockey conference. The Bears represented Brown University and were coached by Brendan Whittet, in his 12th season.

Season
Brown's return to the ice after losing the entire 20–21 season due to the COVID-19 pandemic began well with Luke Kania posting a shutout in the opening match. Afterwards, the Bears took a sharp turn downwards and lost seven straight games. In the stretch neither Kania nor freshman Mathieu Caron played particularly well but the later did perform better overall so the team began to lean more towards Caron as the starter. The biggest problem for Brown was their woeful offense that was shutout in three of those games and would remain inadequate for the remainder of the season.

In early December, Brown finally ended its losing streak when Caron posted back-to-back shutouts with the first coming in surprise fashion against Harvard, a team that would eventually make the NCAA tournament. The short winning streak ended shortly thereafter and the team tried to turn back to Kania but the results were very poor.

An uptick in the number of positive COVID-19 tests in January caused several of Brown's games to be postponed. When they finally got back onto the ice later in the month, Brendan Whittet had settled on Caron as the team's starter and he kept the team in several games, giving them multiple chances to post victories. In their final 14 games, Brown went 3–7–4, a poor record but good enough to get the Bears out of the conference cellar.

The Bears ended the year in 9th place and set them up against St. Lawrence in the First Round of the conference tournament. After losing the first game, Brown fought back to tie the series with an overtime victory and then built a 3–1 lead midway through the deciding match. Unfortunately, the Bears couldn't hold the advantage and after the Saints tied the game things looked bleak for the Brunos. While the game went into overtime, Brown had not scored more than three goals all season. To continue their campaign, the offense would have to rise to the occasion. However, before the Bears had a chance to generate any opportunities, St. Lawrence scored on the first shot of the extra period and ended Brown's season.

Departures

Recruiting

Roster
As of August 19, 2021.

|}

Standings

Schedule and results

|-
!colspan=12 style=";" | Regular Season

|-
!colspan=12 style=";" | 

|- align="center" bgcolor="#e0e0e0"
|colspan=12|Brown Lost Series 1–2

Scoring statistics

Goaltending statistics

Rankings

Note: USCHO did not release a poll in week 24.

References

2021–22
Brown
Brown
Brown
Brown